Adelphoceras is a genus of middle Devonian coiled nautiloids from Europe with an oval whorl section and shallow depressed zone on the inner, dorsal, rim; a strongly contracted T-shaped aperture; ventral siphuncle containing actinosiphonate deposits, and two rows of spines on either side.

Adelphoceras is included in the nautilid family Rutoceratidae, and is also a part of the Tainoceratoidea.

References

 Bernhard Kummel, 1964. Nautiloidea - Nautilida. Treatise on Invertebrate Paleontology, Part K. Geological Society of America and University of Kansas Press.

Prehistoric nautiloid genera
Fossil taxa described in 1870